Alan Frederick Horn (born February 28, 1943) is an American entertainment industry executive. Horn became President and COO of Warner Bros. from 1999 to 2012. Horn next served as the chairman of Walt Disney Studios from 2012 to 2020. During his tenure at Disney, Horn also served as the chief creative officer from 2019 to 2021. Horn agreed to depart from Disney, effective December 31, 2021. 

In July 2022, Horn re-joined Warner Bros., having assumed a new position as a consultant with Warner Bros. Discovery.

Personal life 
Horn was raised on Long Island, New York, in Riverhead. He graduated from Union College in Schenectady, New York, in 1964. In 1971, he received an MBA from Harvard Business School. He was a captain in the United States Air Force.

Horn currently lives in the East Gate Bel Air section of Los Angeles, California, with his wife, Cindy Harrell, a former model. They have two daughters, actress Cody, and Cassidy.

Career 
Horn worked at Norman Lear's television production companies, Tandem Productions and Embassy Communications, the latter of which he was chairman before becoming president of 20th Century Fox in October 1986 soon after it was acquired by Rupert Murdoch. He was one of the founders of Castle Rock Entertainment in 1987. There, he oversaw films including A Few Good Men (1992), The Green Mile (1999), When Harry Met Sally (1989), and the TV sitcom Seinfeld (1989–1998).

Horn became President and COO of Warner Bros. in 1999, where he ran the studio in partnership with Chairman and CEO Barry Meyer for 12 years. Under Horn's leadership, Warner Bros. had many hits, including the Harry Potter series (2001–2011) and Christopher Nolan's The Dark Knight Trilogy (2005–2012). He was also the executive producer on all three films in The Hobbit Trilogy. At age 68, Horn was forced to retire as President and COO of Warner Bros., at the behest of Time Warner Chairman and CEO Jeffrey Bewkes who wanted to groom younger talent to take over at the studio, with Meyer relinquishing his role as studio CEO in March 2013 to be succeeded by Kevin Tsujihara.

In 2012, at the urging of The Walt Disney Company chairman and CEO Bob Iger, Horn was lured out of retirement to become the chairman of Walt Disney Studios, replacing Rich Ross who had been dismissed from the position after having conflicts with Pixar executives. Horn established a successful working relationship with Pixar, Marvel Studios, Lucasfilm, and 20th Century Studios which operated with great autonomy under Disney's overall ownership, while also overseeing strong box office releases from Walt Disney Pictures and Walt Disney Animation Studios.

In 2017, he said of his past professional success:
I have this ... theory that whoever is working in a job deserves to stay ... unless they prove that they don't deserve to be in the job.

On May 1, 2019, Horn was given the added title of chief creative officer (CCO) of Walt Disney Studios. In December 2020, it was announced that effective January 1, 2021, Alan Bergman would become the new chairman of the Walt Disney Studios while Horn would remain as the studios' chief creative officer.

In October 2021, it was announced that Horn would be retiring for a second time at the end of the year, and his position would likely not be filled.

In July 2022, it was reported that Horn would assume a new position with Warner Bros. Discovery. Starting August 1, 2022, Horn began serving as a consultant to the company during its transitionary period following the acquisition of Warner Bros. by Discovery.

References

External links
Corporate Bio
 

American chief executives in the media industry
American media executives
Living people
Union College (New York) alumni
Disney executives
American film studio executives
Chairmen of The Walt Disney Company
20th Century Studios people
Warner Bros. people
People from Long Island
20th-century American Jews
Harvard Business School alumni
Businesspeople from New York City
21st-century American businesspeople
20th-century American businesspeople
1943 births
American independent film production company founders
21st-century American Jews